Amano Jyaku (AMANO Jyaku) is a fictional character, and the titular protagonist of Urotsukidōji ("wandering child"). A renegade man-beast, Amano has spent the past three hundred years scouring the planet for the Chōjin ("Super-Deity"). He is based on Amanojaku, a demon-like creature in Japanese folklore.

Synopsis
Sometime in the 17th century, Amano Jyaku began his search for the Chōjin in the human realm - it is not known whether Megumi Amano or Kuroko accompanied him. Also, during this time, he must have encountered Suikakujyu and started off his infamous rivalry with him.

Little is known up to 1923, where he foiled Suikakujyu's attempt to destroy the Chōjin using a water demon. Unfortunately, it triggered off the Great Kanto earthquake and Tokyo suffered heavy losses.

Cut to Osaka, in the late 1980s/early 1990s, and Amano Jyaku's quest for the Chōjin has taken him to Myojin University. It is here that he, Megumi and Kuroko encounter Tatsuo Nagumo and Akemi Ito. From the outset, Amano believes Ozaki to be the Chōjin. However, it transpires that Ozaki merely had some of the Chōjin'''s power and Amano soon realises that Nagumo is his prime suspect.  From here on Amano becomes the unofficial protector of the Chōjin'' and becomes the defender of all that is right and moral - or so he thinks...

Amano's overall character and origin in the manga and OVA series differ greatly. In the manga, he is stated to be the offspring of a human and demon and therefore is a hybrid of both. Due to his many misdeeds involving Mimi, daughter of the Elder, he is banished from the demonic realm and spends 300 years in the human world. In actuality, the Elder sent Amano to find the Chōjin, a demonic god whose dormant spirit is sealed in the body of a human. He has a rather selfish and amoral personality, with him claiming to women that his sperm can protect them from demons if they have sex with him. He is also shown to have no respect for human life, one example is during his first appearance when he tosses a baby he saved from an oncoming truck into a storm gutter to drown, wondering why he even bothered to help the infant at all. It is implied shortly thereafter that he enjoys seeing blood and death, stating that he never expected to find carnage so soon. He is joined in his search by his human sister Megumi (who has been given demonic powers without being a demon herself) and Kuroko; a small lesser demon who has nothing but respect for Amano despite his flawed personality.

His OVA depiction is much different. Instead of a demon/human hybrid, Amano is a "beast-man" who spent 300 years hunting for the Chōjin. In this version, he is implied to have left his home realm of his own accord instead of being forced to like in the manga. He is also quite stubborn and determined to discover the identity of the Chōjin and wants the prophecy of the three realms being united in harmony to be made a reality more than anything. In addition, he develops a protective bond with Nagumo and Akemi and is genuinely horrified upon seeing the destruction and chaos that Nagumo causes while in demon form. During the final episode of the first OVA series, Amano desperately tries to appeal to Nagumo's human nature to no avail and sheds tears when he realizes that it is beyond his control. As the series goes on, Amano's faith in the prophecy is challenged constantly and eventually resolves to put an end to the Chōjin and preserve the three worlds as they currently exist. This contrasts greatly to his manga counterpart even though he displays a casual and anti-hero type attitude in both versions.

Voice actors
In all of the anime OVAs and films, Amano has been voiced by Tomohiro Nishimura. However, he is voiced by six people in the English dubs of all of the anime. In Legend of the Overfiend, he is voiced by Chris Yates, who is credited under the Pseudonym, Christopher Courage. In Legend of the Demon Womb, he is voiced by Gregory Wolfe, who also uses the Christopher Courage alias. For Return of the Overfiend, his voice actor is uncredited, but is believed to be Daniel Flynn (actor). In Inferno Road, he is voiced by Mark Blackburn. In the Urotsukidoji: New Saga OVAs, he is voiced by Christopher Stalken.

Fictional characters from Kansai